WFLE may refer to:

 WFLE-FM, a radio station (95.1 FM) licensed to serve Flemingsburg, Kentucky, United States
 WFLE (AM), a defunct radio station (1060 AM) formerly licensed to serve Flemingsburg, Kentucky